Cleveland Heights High School (commonly known as Heights, Heights High or Heights High School) is the senior high school of the Cleveland Heights-University Heights City School District, located in Cleveland Heights, Ohio, United States.

History

Cleveland Heights High School was established in 1901 by the Cleveland Heights Board of Education. The building that is currently being used opened in 1926. The student population was 1,772 as of the 2018-2019, school year with 15.02 student/teacher ratio. The student body is mostly African-American, with 75 percent identifying themselves as such, and Caucasian (15%), multiracial (6%), Hispanic (3%), and Asian (2%) minorities.

Heights athletic teams play in Division I.

The school is known for its strong music departments, including the Vocal Music Department (VMD) which includes A Cappella, Men's and Women's Barbershop, Singers, and Men and Women's choruses. The Heights Gospel Choir was founded in 1974, and remains active as an extracurricular ensemble. The Instrumental Music Department (IMD) consists of the Heights High Symphony, Symphonic Winds, Symphonic Band, Concert Band, Concert Orchestra, Marching Band, Jazz Lab, and Jazz Band. During the 1960 and 1970s, Heights High's music programs were nationally recognized, with the Choir and Orchestra considered among the best in the country. For a number of years, world-renowned musicians performed with the Orchestra. The Heights Band & Orchestra Parents organization and Heights Choir Parents Organization played a major role in promoting music and making Heights High synonymous with the highest quality music. The Heights High Symphony, Symphonic Winds and Jazz Ensemble competed in the 2007 Heritage Festival in Chicago, Illinois, culminating with an award ceremony at Medieval Times where the Symphony Orchestra, as well as the Jazz Ensemble, received Gold (or Superior) ratings.

The life stories of 48 graduates of Cleveland Heights High School are featured in the book Every Tiger Has a Tale, written by Gary Stromberg, a 1968 graduate of the school.

In 1991, the school won the 23rd National High School chess tournament.  The team consisted of Andy Gard, Joshua Jex, Ari Singer and Wenning Xing.  Xing also tied for the second place individual spot with a score of 6.0 out of seven, and Waitzkin (of Searching for Bobby Fischer fame) took first place with 6.5 out of seven.

In the summer of 2015, the building began going under major renovations. The building re-opened on August 21, 2017, and the students used the original building for the 2017-2018 school year. The students used the Wiley campus for the 2015-2016 and 2016-2017 school years.

Ohio High School Athletic Association state championships

 Baseball — 1947
 Basketball (men's) — 1997
 Ice Hockey — 1987
 Track and Field — 2008
 Wrestling — 1976

Notable alumni

 Gina Abercrombie-Winstanley (1976), former U.S. Ambassador to Republic of Malta
 Hal Becker (1972), writer
 Jean Berko Gleason (1949), psycholinguist
 Barry Cofield, NFL player, Super Bowl XLII champion
 Chuck Cooper, Tony Award-winning actor
 Eric Fingerhut, President and CEO of Jewish Federations of North America, former CEO of Hillel International, former U.S. Congressman from northeast Ohio, former Ohio State Senator.
 Jimmy Fox (1965), James Gang founder drummer and organist
 Darrell Issa, U.S. Congressman representing the San Diego, CA area.
 Jason Kelce (2006), NFL player for Philadelphia Eagles, Super Bowl LII champion
 Travis Kelce (2008), NFL player for Kansas City Chiefs, Super Bowl LIV and LVII champion
 Steve LaTourette, former U.S. Congressman from northeast Ohio
 Clea Lewis (1983), actor

 Mike McGruder (1980), NFL player for New England Patriots, played in Super Bowl XXXI
 Mel Tucker (1990), Head coach Michigan State, Spartans football team.

Notes and references

External links
Cleveland Heights High School website
Cleveland Heights-University Heights School District website

High schools in Cuyahoga County, Ohio
Cleveland Heights, Ohio
Educational institutions established in 1901
Public high schools in Ohio

1901 establishments in Ohio